In economics, robustness is the ability of a financial trading system to remain effective under different markets and different market conditions, or the ability of an economic model to remain valid under different assumptions, parameters and initial conditions.

External links

Financial markets
Economic methodology